Henry Tosseng (25 November 1900 – January 1972) was a Luxembourgian racing cyclist. He rode in the 1927 Tour de France.

References

1900 births
1972 deaths
Luxembourgian male cyclists